Adoxomyia heminopla is a species of soldier fly in the family Stratiomyidae. It is found in India, Sri Lanka and Java.

References

Diptera of Asia
Stratiomyidae
Insects of India
Insects of Sri Lanka
Insects of Java
Insects described in 1819
Taxa named by Christian Rudolph Wilhelm Wiedemann